Tomasz Schimscheiner (born 26 February 1967 in Kraków, Poland) is a Polish actor.

Filmography

Na Wspólnej

Legenda Tatr

References

External links

1973 births
Living people